Khalid Rahilou (born 19 June 1966) is French former professional boxer of Moroccan descent. He held the WBA light-welterweight world title between 1997–1998, and the EBU European title between 1994–1995.

Amateur career
Rahilou compiled an amateur record of 45 wins, 7 losses and 12 knockouts. He represented Morocco in the 1988 Olympics in the light welterweight division. His results were:

Defeated Avaavau Avaavau (Western Samoa) – RSC 3
Lost to Todd Foster (USA) – KO 2

Professional career
Rahilou began his professional career in 1988 and won his first major regional championship—the European light-welterweight title—in 1994. He later became world champion by winning the WBA light-welterweight title from Frankie Randall in 1997. Rahilou defended the title twice before losing it to Sharmba Mitchell in 1998. Following a loss to Souleymane M'baye in 2002, Rahilou retired from the sport.

|-

|-

References

1966 births
Living people
Sportspeople from Argenteuil
Light-welterweight boxers
Boxers at the 1988 Summer Olympics
Olympic boxers of Morocco
French sportspeople of Moroccan descent
French male kickboxers
Moroccan male kickboxers
Moroccan male boxers
French male boxers